Veeder Farmhouse #1 is a historic home located at Guilderland in Albany County, New York.  It was built about 1830 and is a two-story frame building on a cut stone foundation in the Greek Revival style. There is a -story rear ell.  It features a recessed center entrance with sidelights and transom. It is a "sister" house to the Veeder Farmhouse No. 2.

It was listed on the National Register of Historic Places in 1982.

References

Houses on the National Register of Historic Places in New York (state)
Houses completed in 1830
Greek Revival houses in New York (state)
Houses in Albany County, New York
1830 establishments in New York (state)
National Register of Historic Places in Albany County, New York